Miles Davis Volume 1 refers to two separate but related entities.  The title was originally used for the first time in a pair of compilation albums of recordings made by Miles Davis in 1952, 1953 and 1954, released in 1956 (and reissued many times) as BLP 1501 on the Blue Note Records label.

Miles Davis Volume 1 also refers to a CD compilation that contains the entirety of Young Man with a Horn (BLP 5013, 1951) plus three alternate takes, plus the entirety of Miles Davis, Vol. 3 (BLP 5040, 1954), both released on 10-inch LP.

The album was identified by Scott Yanow in his Allmusic essay "Hard Bop" in 2010 as one of the 17 Essential Hard Bop Recordings.

Release history 
The 12-inch LP (BLP 1501) was originally released in January 1956, followed by Volume 2 (BLP 1502), after Davis won the Down Beat readers poll as best trumpeter. The two volumes of rereleased Miles Davis material were the first releases in Blue Note's new 1500 series of 12"LPs. The music compiled on the two volumes was from three separate recording sessions made over 1952–54, some of which had been previously issued as singles, and as three now discontinued 10-inch LPs.  Volume 1 contained takes of the May 9, 1952 and April 20, 1953 sessions for the label, including alternate takes of some songs. The master takes had originally been issued in 10"LP format under the titles Young Man with a Horn (BLP 5013), and Miles Davis Volume 2 (BLP 5022).  The original BLP 1501 running order is available on some Japanese CD versions and from HDTracks.

The 1988 CD edition (Blue Note CDP 7 81501 2) reused the cover from BLP 1501, but had different content.  The CD compiled the entire tracks recorded on May 9, 1952, and March 6, 1954, whereas the complete 1953 session is now on Miles Davis Volume 2. By appending the alternate takes directly after master takes, of the initial 10-inch release Young Man with a Horn, it did not maintain the original order of the historic record.

The 2001 CD edition (7243 5 32610 2 3) used new cover art based on 1954's Volume 3, and was remastered by Rudy Van Gelder.  Like the 1988 version, it contained the entire 1952 and 1954 sessions, but with alternates following the original running order of BLP 5013.

Track listing

1956 12" LP 
Blue Note – BLP 1501

2001 CD 
Blue Note – 7243 5 32610 2 3

Musicians 
May 9, 1952 
 Miles Davis - trumpet
 J. J. Johnson - trombone
 Jackie McLean - alto saxophone
 Gil Coggins - piano
 Oscar Pettiford - bass
 Kenny Clarke - drums

April 20, 1953
 Miles Davis - trumpet
 J. J. Johnson - trombone
 Jimmy Heath - tenor saxophone
 Gil Coggins - piano
 Percy Heath - bass
 Art Blakey - drums

March 6, 1954
 Miles Davis - trumpet
 Horace Silver - piano
 Percy Heath - bass
 Art Blakey - drums

References

1956 compilation albums
Albums produced by Alfred Lion
Albums produced by Michael Cuscuna
Albums recorded at Van Gelder Studio
Blue Note Records compilation albums
Miles Davis compilation albums